South Mountain (French: Montagne du Sud; Gaelic: Beinn a Deas) is a Canadian range on the mainland portion of Nova Scotia. A granitic ridge stretching from the Annapolis Basin to Mount Uniacke, it forms the southern edge of the Annapolis Valley and shelters the valley from the climate effects of the pelagic coast along the Atlantic Ocean. Together with North Mountain, the two ranges form the Annapolis Highlands region. 

In contrast to its northern counterpart, North Mountain, South Mountain rises gradually over dozens of kilometres from the Atlantic coast and descends sharply at its northern edge where it meets the Meguma strata to form the south wall of the valley. The South Mountain range is also known as the South Mountain Batholith, the largest body of granitoid rocks in the entire Appalachians and comprises both granite barrens and granite uplands. It is estimated to have developed during the late Devonian Age.

The highest point on the ridge is at an unnamed point in Kings County, 26 kilometres southeast of Berwick near Lake George.

See also
 List of highest points of Canadian provinces and territories
 Goler clan

External links
 Atlas of Canada - Facts about mountains

Mountains of Nova Scotia
Landforms of Annapolis County, Nova Scotia
Landforms of Digby County, Nova Scotia
Landforms of Hants County, Nova Scotia
Landforms of Kings County, Nova Scotia
Geology of Nova Scotia
Mountains of Canada under 1000 metres